Aladdin and the King of Thieves is a 1996 American direct-to-video animated musical fantasy adventure film produced by Walt Disney Television Animation. It is the second sequel to the 1992 film Aladdin, and serves as the final chapter and installment of the Arabian Nights-inspired Disney franchise beginning with the first film, and continuing with its first direct-to-video sequel The Return of Jafar and the animated television series.

The film takes place after the third season of the television series and is inspired by the tale Ali Baba and the Forty Thieves from One Thousand and One Nights, replacing Ali Baba with Aladdin, and for the first time since the original Aladdin, the film has a completely new soundtrack instead of the rearranged music from the original film for The Return of Jafar and the series. This film also marks the return of actor Robin Williams, reprising his role as Genie from the first film and not by Dan Castellaneta, who voiced him in the second film, the series, and other media afterwards.

Though this film serves as the series finale of the television series, the characters also appear in a 1999 crossover episode of the animated series Hercules, titled "Hercules and the Arabian Night", as well as the 2007 direct-to-video title called Disney Princess Enchanted Tales: Follow Your Dreams, both of them after this plot. The film received mixed to negative reviews, although it was deemed an improvement over The Return of Jafar.

Plot 
At Agrabah, Aladdin and Princess Jasmine prepare to get married. During the ceremony, the legendary Forty Thieves appear, trying to steal a magical staff. After driving them off, Aladdin and his friends discover the Oracle, a woman within the staff that has the power to answer a single question about absolutely anything to any individual. She reveals that the Thieves want the staff to get to the "ultimate treasure". She hints to Aladdin that all his questions can be answered by his father, who is alive still, much to everyone's surprise. According to the oracle, Aladdin's father is with the Forty Thieves, "trapped within their world".

Aladdin, along with Abu, Iago and Carpet, tracks the thieves and stows away into their hideout, Mount Sesame. There, he discovers that his father Cassim is actually the King of Thieves, their leader. The two have a brief, heartfelt reunion before Cassim's chief subordinate Sa'luk tries to punish Aladdin for infiltrating in their hideout. Cassim, however, cleverly suggests that Aladdin instead face the initiation ritual known as "the Challenge": if he defeats another one of the Forty Thieves, he can take their place. Aladdin defeats Sa'luk and is welcomed into the band. Cassim then reveals why he left his wife and son: to find the Hand of Midas, a powerful artifact that can transform anything it touches into gold. Cassim believed that, with it, he could return to his family and get them out of poverty. With the staff, he could question the oracle as to the precise whereabouts of the artifact. Aladdin convinces Cassim to return with him to Agrabah to live an honest life. Initially hesitant, Cassim agrees after realizing that the wedding can be his last chance to get the Oracle.

For a while, Cassim is glad to spend quality time with Aladdin and his friends. However, he decides to carry on his original scheme with Iago as his new henchman. Meanwhile, Sa'luk travels to Agrabah and sells out his fellow thieves by telling Razoul the password to their hideout in exchange for immunity from prosecution. After all but seven of the thieves are captured, Razoul learns that Aladdin is one of the forty, and his father Cassim is the King himself. While attempting to steal the Oracle, Cassim and Iago are captured by the royal guards, and Razoul reveals to the Sultan that Cassim is the King of Thieves. The Sultan has Cassim and Iago imprisoned for life. Aladdin frees them, but is discovered by Razoul. Despite being a criminal, Aladdin returns to the palace to take responsibility for his actions. The Sultan makes ready to punish Aladdin, but Genie and Jasmine come to his defense, stating that all he wanted was to give his father a second chance. Understanding this, The Sultan accepts Aladdin's apology and resumes preparations for the wedding.

Cassim and Iago return to Mount Sesame, only to be captured by Sa'luk and the remaining seven thieves (Sa'luk deceived them into believing Cassim had betrayed them to Razoul), who force them to use the oracle to find the location of the Hand of Midas. The Oracle directs them to the Vanishing Isle, a marble fortress built on the back of an enormous turtle that periodically dives to the bottom of the ocean, where the Hand is hidden. Iago gets away and goes off to lead Aladdin and Jasmine, Abu and Carpet to his imprisoned father. Aladdin manages to free and reconcile with his father. Working together, they retrieve the Hand just as the turtle is starting to submerge. However, they are ambushed by Sa'luk, who takes Aladdin hostage, demanding that Cassim surrender the Hand. Cassim throws the Hand to Sa'luk, who grabs it by the wrong end and is transformed into a lifeless gold statue. Realizing that his obsession has only brought trouble and his son is actually his ultimate treasure, Cassim throws the Hand into the ship with the remaining thieves aboard, turning it into gold and sinking it.

That night, Aladdin and Jasmine finally get married, with all their friends and family present. Cassim watches the wedding from afar, since he is still a wanted man, and Iago decides to join him on his travels.

Voice cast 

 Scott Weinger as Aladdin
 Brad Kane as Aladdin (singing voice)
 Robin Williams as Genie
 John Rhys-Davies as Cassim
 Merwin Foard as Cassim (singing voice)
 Linda Larkin as Princess Jasmine
 Liz Callaway as Princess Jasmine (singing voice)
 Gilbert Gottfried as Iago
 Jerry Orbach as Sa'Luk
 Frank Welker as Abu
 Val Bettin as The Sultan
 Jim Cummings as Razoul
 CCH Pounder as The Oracle

Additional voices are provided by Jeff Bennett, Corey Burton, Jess Harnell, Clyde Kusatsu, Rob Paulsen, and Frank Welker.

Production 
Following the success of The Return of Jafar, Disney announced in January 1995 that a third film was in production. Later in June, it was scheduled for a home video release in 1996. In September 1995, it was confirmed that Robin Williams would reprise the role of the Genie reportedly for a $1 million salary after he received an apology from Joe Roth for Disney breaching an agreement not to use his voice to merchandise products inspired by Aladdin. With Williams on board, all recordings and animation footage of Dan Castellaneta as the Genie was scrapped, and all of the Genie's scenes were rewritten to fit Williams' comedic style.

Songs

Adaptation 
Two comic adaptations of the movie were on sale September 1996.
 The first was in Marvel Comics Disney Comic Hits #13.
 The second was in Disney Adventures Volume 6 #12.

Release 
Upon its release, the film was accompanied by a marketing campaign at more than $70 million with commercial tie-ins with Best Western, Welch's, Chuck E. Cheese's, Tropicana, Reese's, Hershey's, TGI Fridays, Red Lobster, Friendly's, Applebee's, SEGA, Hasbro, Dairy Queen, Popeyes, Wendy's, Mattel, McDonald's, Scholastic, General Mills, Wawa, Kellogg's, Mars, Nestlé, Cadbury, Holiday Inn Express, Holiday Inn, Days Inn, Capcom, Oral-B, Duracell, Energizer and Kodak.

Home media 
At the time of its release, King of Thieves was reportedly outselling The Return of Jafar, but Disney declined to disclose actual sales figures for the release. In 1996, the film sold  million units in the United States, generating at least  in sales revenue. It was the sixth best-selling film video release in the United States during 1996.

On January 18, 2005, the film was re-released as a special edition DVD and VHS, the same day as the previous film, The Return of Jafar, with the DVD version receiving digitally restored picture, remastered sound, two additional games, and a behind-the-scenes bonus feature. However, the film was matted into a 1.85:1 anamorphic widescreen ratio (an aspect ratio Disney has rarely used for television animation at the time). The DVD went back into the Disney Vault along with the other two films in the series in January 2008. Aladdin and the King of Thieves, along with The Return of Jafar, was released on Blu-ray/DVD/Digital HD Combo Pack on January 5, 2016 as a Disney Movie Club exclusive in North America (with both films matted into a 1.78:1 widescreen ratio this time).

Reception 
Based on 12 reviews collected by Rotten Tomatoes, the film received a 33% approval rating from critics, with an average score of 4.84/10. Caryn James of The New York Times praised the sequel as "far better than The Return of Jafar", while acknowledging that "the video has some other weak spots, but these hardly matter when Aladdin and the King of Thieves is so brimming with comic invention and adventure." Scott Blakey of the Chicago Tribune wrote that the story grows tedious after an hour and recommended The Fool and the Flying Ship instead. The Washington Post stated the "art of animation is strictly Saturday morning quality again (jobbed out to Disney's overseas JV team), and the score is a long step backward from the original, meaning the movie lacks the lingering resonance and memorable visual moments of Disney's big-budget affairs. Essentially, the movie is comparable to other reputable animated titles like The Swan Princess and Balto – pretty good, but not exactly Disney."

Awards and nominations 

|-
| 1997
| Aladdin and the King of Thieves
| Annie Award for Best Home Video Production
| 
|-
| 1997
| Mark Watters, Carl Johnson
| Annie Award for Best Individual Achievement: Music in a Feature/Home Video Production
| 
|-
| 1997
| Aladdin and the King of Thieves
| World Animation Celebration Award for Best Direct to Home Video Production
| 
|}

Cancelled sequel 
In 2005, screenwriter Robert Reece pitched a fourth Aladdin film to DisneyToon executives, although it never came to fruition.

References

External links 

 
 
 
 
 

1996 films
1996 animated films
1996 direct-to-video films
1990s American animated films
1990s musical fantasy films
1990s musical films
American musical fantasy films
American children's animated adventure films
American children's animated fantasy films
American children's animated musical films
American fantasy adventure films
American sequel films
Annie Award winners
Aladdin (franchise)
Australian animated feature films
Australian sequel films
DisneyToon Studios animated films
Disney direct-to-video animated films
Direct-to-video sequel films
American television series finales
Films about theft
Films based on Aladdin
Films based on Ali Baba
Films about father–son relationships
Films scored by Mark Watters
Films set in palaces
Films set on islands
Treasure hunt films
Films about weddings
Disney Television Animation films
1990s children's animated films
Films directed by Tad Stones
Japanese animated films
Japanese sequel films
1990s English-language films
Films set in the Middle Ages